The Europe Zone was one of the two regional zones of the 1949 Davis Cup.

24 teams entered the Europe Zone, with the winner going on to compete in the Inter-Zonal Final against the winner of the America Zone. Italy defeated France in the final, and went on to face Australia in the Inter-Zonal Final.

Draw

First round

Denmark vs. Israel

Luxembourg vs. France

Portugal vs. Great Britain

Czechoslovakia vs. Monaco

Netherlands vs. South Africa

Ireland vs. Chile

Second round

Hungary vs. Belgium

France vs. Denmark

Great Britain vs. Czechoslovakia

Italy vs. South Africa

Chile vs. Egypt

Sweden vs. Norway

Austria vs. Yugoslavia

Quarterfinals

Hungary vs. Switzerland

France vs. Czechoslovakia

Italy vs. Chile

Yugoslavia vs. Sweden

Semifinals

Hungary vs. France

Italy vs. Yugoslavia

Final

France vs. Italy

References

External links
Davis Cup official website

Davis Cup Europe/Africa Zone
Europe Zone
Davis Cup